Ernest Witty Cotton was an Anglo-Spanish footballer, tennis player and businessman. In 1899 Witty, a Spanish national tennis champion, became a founding member of the Real Club de Tenis Barcelona and in the early 1900s he played football for FC Barcelona. He was also a successful trader and his family company, the Witty Group, continues to operate today. He is the younger brother of Arthur Witty.

Early years 
Witty was the son of  Frederick Witty, a British entrepreneur, who settled in Barcelona. Frederick, who belonged to a Yorkshire family, initially intended to emigrate to Argentina but was persuaded to go to Spain by friends. In 1873 he founded his own shipping agency under the name of F. Witty, subsequently establishing business links between Spain and the United Kingdom. Ernest and his brother Arthur were educated at Merchant Taylors' School in Merseyside, where sport was regarded as a major part of a young man's development. On their return to Barcelona the two brothers joined their father's company which now became known as Witty Sociedad Anonima, Witty S.A.

FC Barcelona 
Ernest and Arthur returned to Spain with a love of sports. Unable to play rugby union due to a lack of suitable pitches, the Wittys began to organise football games between company teams made up of employees. In 1899, Ernest also became a founding member of the Real Club de Tenis Barcelona. Ernest played tennis with, among others, Joan Gamper, and when Gamper founded FC Barcelona in October 1899, the Witty brothers quickly became involved. They used their company to imports regulation balls, referees whistles, and nets from England. Legend also has it that the Witty brothers also imported the legendary club colours, the blaugrana, from the original colours used by Merchant Taylors' rugby team. However, FC Basel and other Swiss clubs that Gamper played for and his home canton of Zurich have all been credited and/or claimed to be the inspiration. In 1905 Witty, together with Romà Forns, also helped FC Barcelona win its first Catalan football championship.

Honours

Footballer

FC Barcelona
 Catalan Champions: 1904–05

Sources 
Morbo: The Story of Spanish Football (2003),  Phil Ball.
 Barça: A People's Passion (1998), Jimmy Burns.

External links 
 Ernest Witty at the Witty Group

Year of birth missing
Year of death missing
Businesspeople from Catalonia
Footballers from Catalonia
English businesspeople
English footballers
FC Barcelona players
People educated at Merchant Taylors' Boys' School, Crosby
Spanish businesspeople
Spanish footballers
Spanish male tennis players
Spanish people of English descent
Association footballers not categorized by position